Chop marks on coins are Chinese characters stamped or embossed onto coins by merchants in order to validate the weight, authenticity and silver content of the coin. Depending on particular technique coins said to have been "chopmarked", "countermarked" and "counterstamped".

Starting with the 18th century, a number of European, American and Japanese silver coins (generically known as the trade dollar) began circulating in the Far East. Each merchant's firm had its own mark and, after heavy circulation, the design of the coin became completely obliterated by the chop marks.

Chop marks were also used on copper-alloy U.K. Large Pennies, U.S. Large Cents and other copper coins of Europe, Central, South and North America and have Hindu, Chinese, Japanese and Arabic nation's chopmarks as well as English alphabet chop marks from British and American Merchants in Hong Kong from the 1830s to 1960s when world silver coins and large pennies from many European and British Empire nations gave up their colonies and their coinage became demonetized.  Chinese tokens from the province of Jiangsu at the time of the Taiping Rebellion, these tokens were usually issued by local authorities and could only be used to pay local merchants, tax collectors, local banks, and other local businesses during this period.

The practice lasted until China demonetized the silver coins in 1933.

See also
 Overstrike (numismatics) — where a new design is struck over an existing coin
 Countermark
 Counterfeit
 Punch-marked coins

Further reading 

C.J. Gullberg, Chopmarked Coins - A History. The Silver Coins Used in China 1600-1935 (iAsure Group, 2014).

References 

Coins of China
Seals (insignia)
Qing dynasty